Ecology or Catastrophe: The Life of Murray Bookchin is a 2015 biography of Murray Bookchin by Janet Biehl.

Further reading

External links 

 

2015 non-fiction books
American biographies
Biographies about anarchists
English-language books
Oxford University Press books